El retrato de un canalla is a 1984 Venezuelan telenovela produced by Venevisión and distributed internationally by Venevisión International. Alba Roversi and Manuel Escolano starred as the main protagonists. The main theme song for the telenovela is "Has lo que tu quieras" by Antonietta.

Plot
Andrea Moncayo has been overcome with sadness over the death of her boyfriend on her wedding day. She begins dating and later marries Miguel Moncayo, a noble man with two daughters from his first marriage, but they are not in love. Andrea meets Gabriel Serrano, a frivolous man with whom she falls in love.

Cast
Alba Roversi
Manuel Escolano
Raúl Xiques
Yolanda Mendez
Bety Ruth
Elena Farias

References

1984 telenovelas
Venevisión telenovelas
Venezuelan telenovelas
1984 Venezuelan television series debuts
1984 Venezuelan television series endings
Spanish-language telenovelas
Television shows set in Venezuela